Ribonuclease P protein subunit p20 is an enzyme that in humans is encoded by the POP7 gene.

References

Further reading

External links